The European Region of Gastronomy is a title given every year to one or more cities or regions in Europe. The title is awarded by the International Institute of Gastronomy, Culture, Arts and Tourism (IGCAT). Kuopio, a city in eastern Finland, is the title holder for the year 2020.

Goals 

The goal of the project is to contribute to the better quality of life by:
 raising awareness about the importance of cultural and food uniqueness
 stimulating creativity and gastronomic innovation
 educating for better nutrition
 improving sustainable tourism standards
 highlighting distinctive food cultures
 strengthening community well-being

List of European Regions of Gastronomy

See also 
European Capital of Culture
European Youth Capital
European Green Capital Award

References 

European arts awards
Gastronomy in Europe